Aggie Memorial Stadium is an outdoor football stadium in the southwestern United States, located on the campus of New Mexico State University in Las Cruces, New Mexico. It is the home field of the FBS independent New Mexico State Aggies.

Opened  in 1978, the current seating capacity is 28,853. It is the former home of Aggies women's soccer.

Prior to 1978
Prior to 1978, the Aggies had played on the same site since 1933.  Located just to the northeast of Hadley Hall (the university's Administration building), and originally known as Quesenberry Field, the original Memorial Stadium was built over it in 1950. It was dedicated as a memorial to New Mexico A&M students who had died in World War II, World War I, and the Spanish–American War, among whom was Henry C. Gilbert Jr., whose parents were instrumental in the 10-year-long fundraising drive.

Memorial Stadium, which served for 28 seasons, was replaced both due to its small size (maximum seating capacity of 12,155) and the want of an expanded athletics plant with more infrastructure and parking. (Currently Memorial Tower, which was originally part of the press box of the stadium, is the only remaining reminder of the stadium. It is now structurally incorporated into the university's Health and Social Services building and houses a memorial lounge and computer lab.)

The "New" stadium
The "new" Aggie Memorial Stadium, dedicated to alumni who had served in the Korean War and Vietnam War, was built for $4 million over a period of 18 months. It was funded by the state legislature as part of a capital project on the campus.

Its inaugural game in 1978 saw the Aggies defeat nearby rival Texas–El Paso (UTEP) 35–32 on September 16. Twenty years (and ten days) later, the Aggies and UTEP Miners played to the largest attendance (32,993) in stadium history, as the Aggies won again, 33–24.

For its first 36 seasons, the playing field was natural grass; UBU Sports Speed S5-M synthetic turf was installed prior to the 2014 season.

Stadium design
Designed by alumnus Craig Protz of Bohering-Protz Associates, the stadium was built just to the south of the Pan American Center, the home of Aggie basketball. It boasts a unique design in which earth that was excavated to construct the lower bowl and field level was moved to the sides of the stadium to support the upper level, with a street level concourse dividing the lower and upper bowls.

The first level of seating wraps around the field, except for two   gaps behind each end zone. The southern end is a grass berm, with the Fulton Athletics Center, a $6 million structure constructed in 2004 housing athletics offices, an athletic training and education center, and club facilities, behind it. The northern end leads to the locker room facilities and main entrance to the stadium.

Because of these gaps it was previously impossible to access the east side of the stadium from the west, and vice versa, without exiting the stadium and re-entering on the other side. A bridge over the north ramp constructed prior to the 2006 season now allows fans to cross from one side of the stadium to the other. The seating extends to a rounded second level on either side of the field, which extends the length of the playing field. The curved, undulating design of the upper level is reminiscent of similarly designed structures such as Memphis' Liberty Bowl Stadium and the now-demolished Tampa Stadium, albeit on a somewhat smaller scale.

Improvements
The original four pole sodium vapor lighting system is now augmented by four additional smaller poles added prior to the 2005 season to increase the stadium's lighting capacity for televised night games. A $1.5 million scoreboard, including a  video screen, was added in 2007, as well as a new team meeting and video room complex adjacent to the field house on the stadium's north end. A club level area called Club 27 was added in 2015, which reduced the stadium's total capacity to 28,853, but added 92 club level seats at the cost of $1.1 million.

Attendance records

Other uses
In addition to football, the stadium occasionally hosts major concerts and other large outdoor gatherings on campus.

Concerts
Artists that have performed at the stadium include Metallica, Guns N' Roses, Faith No More, The Eagles, Vans Warped Tour & Paul McCartney, among others.

Other events
During the 2005–06 renovation of the nearby Pan American Center, the stadium hosted the university's commencement ceremonies, although they returned to the Pan Am following completion of the renovations. Also, Mayfield High School and Las Cruces High School play against each other in the stadium every year in November. (Varsity only). Starting in November 2017, Onate High School and Centennial High School will play each other in the stadium to start a new tradition.

Gallery

See also
 List of NCAA Division I FBS football stadiums

References

External links
 NM State Sports.com – Aggie Memorial Stadium

1978 establishments in New Mexico
American football venues in New Mexico
College football venues
College soccer venues in the United States
New Mexico State Aggies football
Soccer venues in New Mexico
Sports venues completed in 1978